Awtuw (Autu), also known as Kamnum, is spoken in Sandaun Province, Papua New Guinea. It is a polysynthetic language closely related to Karawa and Pouye. It is spoken in Galkutua, Gutaiya, Kamnom, Tubum, and Wiup villages in Kamnom East ward, East Wapei Rural LLG, Sandaun Province.

It is an endangered language, being widely replaced by Tok Pisin.

Phonology
Awtuw consonants are:

Awtuw vowels are:

Pronouns
Pronouns are:

{| 
!  !! sg !! du !! pl
|-
! 1
| wan || nan || nom
|-
! 2
| yen || an || om
|-
! 3m
| rey
| rowspan="2" | ræw
| rowspan="2" | rom
|-
! 3f
| tey
|}

References

 
 
 Whitehead, Carl R. 1992. Review of: a grammar of Awtuw, by Harry Feldman.
 Rosetta Project:Awtuw Swadesh List

Languages of Sandaun Province
Ram languages
Endangered languages of Oceania
Endangered Papuan languages
Polysynthetic languages